Bolton House may refer to:

Dr. W. T. Bolton House, Pasadena, California
James Wade Bolton House, Alexandria, Louisiana
Lewis and Elizabeth Bolton House, Jefferson City, Missouri
James H. Bolton House, Bath, New York